Lugaid Loígde "Lugaid of the Calf Goddess", also known as Lugaid mac Dáire, was a legendary King of Tara and High King of Ireland. He is a son of Dáire Doimthech, ancestor of the Dáirine, and gives his epithet to their principal royal sept, the Corcu Loígde. A descendant of Lugaid, with whom he may be to some extent identical, is the famous Mac Con, listed in the Old Irish kinglist Baile Chuinn Chétchathaig as Mac Con macc aui (moccu) Lugde Loígde.

In some later syncretic traditions, as Lugaid Laigde, he is made a son of Eochu mac Ailella, and given a son Rechtaid Rígderg. Another late emanation is Lugaid Luaigne.

The Five Lugaids and the Loathly Lady

See also
 Lugaid (disambiguation)
 Dáire
 Lugh
 Loathly Lady

Notes

References

 Edel Bhreathnach and Kevin Murray, "Baile Chuinn Chétchathaig: Edition", in Edel Bhreathnach (ed.), The Kingship and Landscape of Tara. Dublin: Four Courts Press for The Discovery Programme. 2005. pp. 73–94
 Francis John Byrne, Irish Kings and High Kings. Dublin: Four Courts Press. 2nd revised edition, 2001.
 Thomas Charles-Edwards, Early Christian Ireland. Cambridge University Press. 2000.
 G. F. Dalton, "The Tradition of Blood Sacrifice to the Goddess Éire", in Studies: An Irish Quarterly Review, Vol. 63, No. 252 (Winter, 1974): 343–354. JSTOR
 James MacKillop, Dictionary of Celtic Mythology. Oxford University Press. 1998.
 Ailbhe Mac Shamhráin and Paul Byrne, "Prosopography I: Kings named in Baile Chuinn Chétchathaig and the Airgíalla Charter Poem", in Edel Bhreathnach (ed.), The Kingship and Landscape of Tara. Dublin: Four Courts Press for The Discovery Programme. 2005. pp. 159–224
 Kuno Meyer (ed. & tr.), Fianaigecht: being a collection of hitherto inedited Irish poems and tales relating to Finn and his Fiana, with an English translation. Todd Lecture Series, Royal Irish Academy, Volume 16.  Dublin: Hodges Figgis. 1910.
 Gerard Murphy, "On the Dates of Two Sources Used in Thurneysen's Heldensage: I. Baile Chuind and the date of Cín Dromma Snechtai", in Ériu 16 (1952): 145-51. includes edition and translation.
 Michael A. O'Brien (ed.) with intr. by John V. Kelleher, Corpus genealogiarum Hiberniae. DIAS. 1976. / partial digital edition: Donnchadh Ó Corráin (ed.), Genealogies from Rawlinson B 502. University College, Cork: Corpus of Electronic Texts. 1997.
 John O'Donovan (ed.), "The Genealogy of Corca Laidhe", in Miscellany of the Celtic Society. Dublin: Printed for the Celtic Society. 1849. alternative scan
 T. F. O'Rahilly, Early Irish History and Mythology. Dublin Institute for Advanced Studies. 1946.
 Whitley Stokes (ed. & tr.), "Cóir Anmann (Fitness of Names)", in Whitley Stokes and Ernst Windisch, Irische Texte mit Wörterbuch. Volume 3, Parts 1-2. Leipzig: Verlag von S. Hirzel. 1891 (1); 1897 (2). pp. 285–444. alternative scan I alternative scan II

Legendary High Kings of Ireland